Jordan Moeller (born April 24, 1995) is an American figure skater. He is the 2017 International Challenge Cup silver medalist and finished in the top ten at the 2014 World Junior Championships.

Personal life 
Moeller was born on April 24, 1995, in Davenport, Iowa. After graduating from Harold L. Richards High School in Oak Lawn, Illinois, Moeller began taking classes at Moraine Valley Community College. He later enrolled at the University of Colorado Colorado Springs, studying psychology and criminal justice.

Career 
Moeller won the junior gold medal at the Gardena Spring Trophy in April 2013 and was one of the recipients of U.S. Figure Skating's Athlete Alumni Ambassador (3A) award the following month. After winning silver on the junior level at the 2014 U.S. Championships, he was selected for the 2014 World Junior Championships in Sofia, Bulgaria, where he placed ninth in both segments and overall.

While practicing a quad toe loop on December 22, 2015, Moeller fractured his fibula and tore a ligament in his right ankle; as a result, he withdrew from the 2016 U.S. Championships. He finished tenth at the 2017 U.S. Championships. In February 2017, he won his first senior international medal, silver at the International Challenge Cup in The Hague, Netherlands.

Programs

Competitive highlights 
CS: Challenger Series; JGP: Junior Grand Prix

2012–present

Juvenile to novice levels

Detailed results
Small medals for short and free programs awarded only at ISU Championships. At team events, medals awarded for team results only.

Senior career

Junior level

References

External links 

 
 Jordan Moeller at IceNetwork

1995 births
American male single skaters
Living people
Sportspeople from Davenport, Iowa